Polytechnic of Porto - School of Engineering (ISEP) is a public polytechnic higher learning and research engineering institute, located in the city of Porto, Portugal. ISEP is divided in 8 departments, with an emphasis on applied science and technology.

ISEP was founded by the minister Fontes Pereira de Melo in 1852 as Escola Industrial do Porto (Porto School of Industry) to support the industrialization of Portugal, and some time later upgraded to Instituto Industrial do Porto (Porto Institute of Industry). Since 1989, was grouped with other schools in the Polytechnic Institute of Porto. Its motto is Saber Fazer — "Know-how".

Today, ISEP is one of the biggest and best known engineering schools in Portugal, with well over 6000 students and 500 faculty members. It has research facilities for real-time systems, artificial intelligence, knowledge based systems, and decision support systems, some of them internationally recognized as leading R&D centers (e.g. GECAD, CISTER, LSA) as accredited by the Fundação para a Ciência e a Tecnologia of the Portuguese Ministry of Science, Technology and Higher Education.

History
The institution has had several names and different roles since its foundation in 1852:
 1852 The Escola Industrial do Porto (School of Industry) is founded by the minister Fontes Pereira de Melo, during the reign of King Pedro V of Portugal.
 1864 The school was transformed into an Institute, as Instituto Industrial do Porto (Institute of Industry), and was integrated into the new Industrial sector on the frame of the Instituto Industrial de Lisboa established in Lisbon.
 1905 It was allowed to provide higher education (ensino superior).
 1918 The institute was reorganized and transformed again into a non-higher education technical institute of intermediate education (ensino médio)  by the minister Azevedo Neves reforms. It started conferring the titles of engenheiro auxiliar (auxiliary engineer) by law Lei 1 638 de 23 de Julho de 1924 in 1924, and agente técnico de engenharia (technical agent of engineering) from 1926 onwards.
 1975 After the Carnation Revolution of 1974, the institute was upgraded to higher education status and started to award 4-year bacharelato degrees conferring the title of technical engineer (engenheiro técnico). Integrated into the university sector and renamed ISEP - Instituto Superior de Engenharia do Porto (Superior Institute of Engineering), it conferred technical engineering degrees while the universities awarded 5-year engineering degrees.
 1989 By force of law Decreto-Lei n.º 389/88, de 25 de Outubro (1988), ISEP was integrated into the newly created polytechnic sector and made part of the Polytechnic Institute of Porto. It started to award exclusively 3-year bacharelato degrees conferring the title of technical engineer (engenheiro técnico) and CESE (Curso de Estudos Superiores Especializados) courses conferring the DESE (Diploma de Estudos Superiores Especializados) diploma, a complementary diploma to the bacharelato degree.
 1998 ISEP started to award licenciatura bietápica degrees (3-year bacharelato plus 2 extra years conferring the licenciatura, equivalent to the licenciatura (licentiate) degree which until then had been awarded only by the universities).
 2004 ISEP seen its first engineering licenciatura courses accredited by the Ordem dos Engenheiros, the Portuguese engineering association. The first accredited courses were in chemical engineering and electronic engineering. Beyond the public universities, only Lisbon (ISEL) and Porto (ISEP) state-run polytechnic engineering institutions had accredited courses in the Ordem dos Engenheiros in 2006.
 2007 Like the other Portuguese polytechnic institutions, on the frame of the Bologna process, ISEP was allowed to start awarding independent masters' degrees as a second cycle of study after the initial 3-year first cycle which grant a licenciatura. Previously, since 2002, it only awarded master's degrees in some fields with the support of Instituto Superior Técnico a university engineering institution from Lisbon.
 2014 ISEP becomes the Higher Education Institution in Portugal with the most number of study plans certified by EUR-ACE standards,  accredited degrees in Engineering in the European Higher Education Area.
 2017 ISEP's Msc in Informatics Engineering is the first master's degree program in Portugal accredited by the United States-based ABET, assigned to the Engineering Accreditation Commission (EAC), a trusted accreditation for employers worldwide attesting that graduates are prepared to enter the workforce as licensed professional engineers.

Campus
ISEP's campus spans approximately 50,000 square meters in Pólo Universitário, near São João Hospital. Dormitories and some of student life facilities are located outside the campus, but almost all classes are held on campus. ISEP campus was initially located in the central Porto and moved to current one in the 1960s.

Departments
ISEP is divided into different schools within its campus:
 DEC - Civil engineering
 DEG - Geotechnical engineering
 DEQ - Chemical engineering
 DEE - Electrical and Computer engineering
 DEM - Mechanical engineering
 DEI - Software engineering and Computer science
 DMA - Mathematics
 DFI - Physics
 DOG - Management

Studies
Following the Bologna Process, higher education study plans are divided into 1st cycle BSc (3 years), 2nd cycle MSc (2 years).

BSc
 Automotive Engineering
 Chemical Engineering1
 Civil Engineering
 Electrical and Computer Engineering1
 Electrical Engineering – Power Systems1
 Geotechnical and Geoenvironmental Engineering1*
 Software Engineering1
 Instrumentation Engineering and Metrology
 Mechanical Engineering1
 Medical Computing and Instrumentation Engineering
 Systems Engineering

MSc
 Applied Mathematics (Finance and Engineering)
 Chemical Engineering1
 Civil Engineering
 Electrical and Computer Engineering1
 Electrical Engineering – Power Systems1
 Geotechnical and Geoenvironmental Engineering1*
 Informatics Engineering1 2 
 Instrumentation Engineering and Metrology
 Mechanical Engineering1
 Medical Computing and Instrumentation Engineering
 Sustainable Energies

(1) EUR-ACE certification completed, (1*) EUR-ACE certification ongoing.
(2) US ABET-EAC accredited program

See also
List of colleges and universities in Portugal
Higher education in Portugal

References

External links

General
 ISEP
 Student Portal
 AEISEP - Student association

Departments
 DEC Portal
 DEE Portal
 DEI Portal
 DEM Portal
 DEQ Portal
 DFI Portal
 DEA Portal

R&D
 CISTER - Research Centre in Real-Time Computing Systems
 GECAD - Knowledge Engineering and Decision Support Group
 Laboratório Sistemas Autónomos (LSA) - Autonomous Systems Laboratory
 GILT - Graphics, Interaction and Learning Technologies Group
 LEMA - Laboratório de Engenharia Matemática - Mathematical Engineering Lab
 GICEC - Grupo de Investigação e Consultoria em Engenharia Civil 
 GRAQ - Grupo de Reação e Análises Químicas
 CIDEM - Centro de Investigação e Desenvolvimento em Engenharia Mecânica
 CIETI - Centro de Inovação em Engenharia e Tecnologia Industrial Center of Innovation in Engineering and Industrial Technology
 BioMark, Sensor Research

Polytechnic Institute of Porto
Schools in Porto